Ivan Čiernik (born October 30, 1977) is a Slovak former professional ice hockey player. He last played for Eispiraten Crimmitschau of DEL2. He also previously played in the National Hockey League (NHL).

Playing career
Čiernik was drafted as 216th overall in 1996 by the Ottawa Senators. He has played for the Washington Capitals and played a total of 89 regular season NHL games, scoring 12 goals and 14 assists. He has also played for Kölner Haie of the Deutsche Eishockey Liga (DEL) and for Sibir Novosibirsk of the Kontinental Hockey League (KHL).

On July 22, 2011, Čiernik signed a one-year contract (with an optional one-year extension) with the Malmö Redhawks of the HockeyAllsvenskan.

The following season, Čiernik returned to the DEL signing a contract with his third German club, the Hannover Scorpions on July 9, 2012. After one season, with the Scorpions ceasing participation in the DEL, Čiernik left to sign a one-year contract with Augsburger Panther on July 5, 2013.

Career statistics

Regular season and playoffs

References

External links

1977 births
Adirondack Red Wings players
Augsburger Panther players
Cincinnati Mighty Ducks players
Grizzlys Wolfsburg players
ETC Crimmitschau players
Grand Rapids Griffins players
Grand Rapids Griffins (IHL) players
Hannover Scorpions players
HC Sibir Novosibirsk players
HK Nitra players
Kölner Haie players
Living people
Ottawa Senators draft picks
Ottawa Senators players
People from Levice
Sportspeople from the Nitra Region
Portland Pirates players
Slovak expatriate ice hockey players in Russia
Slovak expatriate ice hockey players in Germany
Slovak ice hockey left wingers
Washington Capitals players
Worcester IceCats players
Slovak expatriate ice hockey players in the United States
Slovak expatriate ice hockey players in Canada
Slovak expatriate ice hockey players in Sweden